Colus holboelli is a species of sea snail, a marine gastropod mollusk in the family Colidae, the true whelks and the like.

Description
The length of the shell attains 61.4 mm.

Distribution
This marine species occurs off Svalbard.

References

 MEDIN. (2011). UK checklist of marine species derived from the applications Marine Recorder and UNICORN. version 1.0.

External links
 Möller, H. P. C. (1842). Index Molluscorum Groenlandiae. Naturhistorisk Tidsskrift. 4: 76-97 [Copenhagen
 Reeve, L. A. (1855). Account of the shells collected by Captain Sir Edward Belcher, C.B., North of Beechey Island, pp. 392–399, pls. 32–33, In: E. Belcher, The last of the Arctic voyages: being a narrative of the expedition in H.M.S. Assistance, under the command of Captain Sir Edward Belcher, C.B., in search of Sir John Franklin, during the years 1852–53–54: with notes on the natural history. Lovell Reeve, London. 2 volumes
 Jeffreys, J. G. (1883). On the Mollusca procured during the cruise of H. M. S. Triton, between the Hebrides and Faeroes in 1882. Proceedings of the Zoological Society of London. (1883): 389-399, pl. 44.
 Posselt H.J. (1895). Østgrølandske Mollusker. Meddelelser om Grønland. 19: 61-93, pl. 1.
 Harmer F.W. (1914-1918). The Pliocene Mollusca of Great Britain, being supplementary to S.V. Wood's monograph of the Crag Mollusca. Vol. 1. Monographs of the Palaeontographical Society. 67(330): 1-200, pl. 1-24 (part 1, February 1914); 68(333): 201-302, pl. 25-32 (part 2, July 1915); 70 (337): 303- 461, pl. 33-44 (part 3, February 1918); 71(341): i-xii, 463-483 (part 4, April 1919).
 Sars, G.O. (1878). Bidrag til Kundskaben om Norges arktiske Fauna. I. Mollusca Regionis Arcticae Norvegiae. Oversigt over de i Norges arktiske Region Forekommende Bløddyr. Brøgger, Christiania. xiii + 466 pp., pls 1-34 & I-XVIII
 Gofas, S.; Le Renard, J.; Bouchet, P. (2001). Mollusca. in: Costello, M.J. et al. (eds), European Register of Marine Species: a check-list of the marine species in Europe and a bibliography of guides to their identification. Patrimoines Naturels. 50: 180-213.

Colidae
Gastropods described in 1842